Irina Kazakova (born September 23, 1986) is known as one of the world's most flexible rhythmic gymnasts. She specializes in contortion and rhythmic gymnastics on Russia's national team. She is trained with a personal trainer, with whom she works on her oversplits. Her most popular performance is her "Snake Dance". As a rhythmic gymnast, she has performed with the ball, clubs, hoop, and ribbons.

Kazakova currently resides in Los Angeles. She is a certified free diver & scuba diver, and has worked in underwater modeling performance.

She is also known for underwater and fashion/portrait photography.

Awards and honors 

 2002: Honored Master of Sports in Rhythmic Gymnastics, Russian Award, Government of Russia (The highest national honor for achievements in this field)
 2002–2007: Russian National Rhythmic Gymnastics Team member
 2003: 1st Place – Russian Open Cup Rhythmic Gymnastics
 2003: “Miss Cleopatra” rhythmic gymnastics award, Alexandria, Egypt
 2007: Finalist, The Minute of the Glory (Russian version of  America's Got Talent)
 2007: Record winner of The Show of Russian Records 2010 
 2008 "Shock News" TV show - Featured, Contortionist, Tokyo, Japan 
 2007-2009 "Golden Ice of Stradivary" tour, "The road to Vancouver" tour, "King of Ice". Aerialist tour, Contortionist 
 2009 "Art on Ice" - Aerialist, Contortionist, Zurich, Lausanne, Switzerland 
 2010 Launching "Material Girl" Madonna's new clothing line and new single  
Contortionist, New York
 2010 "MTV Music Awards" - Contortionist, Miami Beach, FL
 2012 Theater "Belini" by Cipriani, Contortionist, Ibiza, Spain
 2012 Snoop Dogg Presents : The Bad Girls of Comedy (TV movie, netflix) Contortionist, Los Angeles  
Featured on MSNBC 
 2013 Talent, Contortionist in Dance nation - Los Angeles, California
 2013 Movie Pain & Gain ( directed by Michael Bay) Contortionist, Miami Beach, FL
 2010-2019 ULTRA - Aerialist, contortionist, Miami, FL2014 
 2013 Featured on Discovery Channel - Photo exhibition, Art collaboration with Gino Tozzi LMNT Gallery, Miami, FL
 2016-2017 C'est Rouge Circus-Cabaret Show - Contortionist/ Aerialist, Faena Theater, Miami Beach, FL
 2017 Die Antwoord's music video "FFFF" - Contortionist, Los Angeles, California
 2017 - Die Antwoord's short comedy horror film "Tommy can't sleep". Contortionist, Los Angeles, California
 2017-2018 "Sensatia" Circus / Cabaret - Contortionist - Faena Theater, Miami Beach, FL

References

1986 births
Contortionists
Living people
Russian rhythmic gymnasts
People with acquired American citizenship